Phaethoquornithes is a clade of birds that contains Eurypygimorphae and Aequornithes, which was first recovered by genome analysis in 2014. Members of Eurypygimorphae were originally classified in the obsolete group Metaves, and Aequornithes were classified as the sister taxon to Musophagiformes or Gruiformes.

This group has also been informally called Ardeae. Older classifications have used Ardeae in a different sense, as a suborder of Ciconiiformes containing herons and related species.

Cladogram based on Kuhl et al. (2020), with clade names following Sangster et al (2022).

References

Neognathae